Vikhroli Assembly constituency  is one of the 288 Vidhan Sabha (Legislative Assembly) constituencies of Maharashtra state in western India.

Overview
Vikhroli constituency is one of the 26 Vidhan Sabha constituencies located in the Mumbai Suburban district.

Vikhroli is part of the Mumbai North East Lok Sabha constituency along with five other Vidhan Sabha segments, namely Mulund, Ghatkopar West, Ghatkopar East, Mankhurd Shivaji Nagar and Bhandup West in the Mumbai Suburban district.

Members of Legislative Assembly

Election results

Assembly Elections 2019

Assembly Elections 2014

Assembly Elections 2009

References

Assembly constituencies of Mumbai
Politics of Mumbai Suburban district
Assembly constituencies of Maharashtra